Charles Henry Graves (June 24, 1872 – August 15, 1940) was a Democratic politician in the U.S. state of Ohio who was  Ohio Secretary of State 1911–1915.

Biography

Charles H. Graves was born in Ottawa County, Ohio.  His father was born in Germany. Graves attended the public schools of Oak Harbor, Ohio, and the University of Michigan Law School, where he graduated in 1893. He had previously studied law in Oak Harbor. He was admitted to the bar in 1893 at Columbus, Ohio.

Graves married Emma B. Mylander of Oak Harbor on September 2, 1896, and had two sons. He served as city solicitor of Oak Harbor, and as Prosecuting Attorney of Ottawa County, Ohio, elected to three year terms in 1900 and 1903. In 1909 he was chairman of the Ottawa County Democratic Central and Executive Committees.

Graves was elected on the Democratic ticket as Secretary of State in 1910, and re-elected in 1912.

Graves died following surgery in August 1940.

References

1872 births
People from Ottawa County, Ohio
Secretaries of State of Ohio
Ohio Democrats
Ohio lawyers
University of Michigan Law School alumni
County district attorneys in Ohio
1940 deaths
People from Oak Harbor, Ohio